Briton Ferry East is an electoral ward of Neath Port Talbot county borough, Wales.  Briton Ferry West falls within the parish of Briton Ferry and the parliamentary constituency of Aberavon.

Briton Ferry East is bounded by the wards of Briton Ferry West to the west; Neath East and Cimla to the north; Pelenna to the east; Bryn and Cwmavon to the southeast; and Baglan to the south.  Most of Briton Ferry East consists of open grassland and woodland with a residential and commercial strip to the far west of the ward.

Election results

2022 election

2017 election

2012 election

2008 election

2004 election

1999 election

1995 election

References

Electoral wards of Neath Port Talbot
Briton Ferry